Schleich is a German producer of handpainted toy figurines and accessories. Schleich may also refer to:

Schleich, Germany, municipality in the Trier-Saarburg district, in Rhineland-Palatinate, Germany

Carl Ludwig Schleich (1859–1922), German surgeon and writer
Eduard Schleich (disambiguation), various people
Josef Schleich (1902–1949), Austrian humanitarian
Wolfgang P. Schleich (born 1957), professor of theoretical physics
Schleich., taxonomic author abbreviation of Johann Christoph Schleicher